The Geologic Calendar is a scale in which the geological lifetime of the Earth is mapped onto a calendrical year; that is to say, the day one of the Earth took place on a geologic January 1 at precisely midnight, and today's date and time is December 31 at midnight. On this calendar, the inferred appearance of the first living single-celled organisms, prokaryotes, occurred on a geologic February 25 around 12:30pm to 1:07pm, dinosaurs first appeared on December 13, the first flower plants on December 22 and the first primates on December 28 at about 9:43pm. The first Anatomically modern humans did not arrive until around 11:48 p.m. on New Year's Eve, and all of human history since the end of the last ice-age occurred in the last 82.2 seconds before midnight of the new year. 

A variation of this analogy instead compresses Earth's 4.6 billion year-old history into a single day: While the Earth still forms at midnight, and the present day is also represented by midnight, the first life on Earth would appear at 4:00am,  dinosaurs would appear at 10:00pm, the first flowers 10:30pm, the first primates 11:30pm, and modern humans would not appear until the last two seconds of 11:59pm. 

A third analogy, created by University of Washington paleontologist Peter Ward and astronomer Donald Brownlee, who are both famous for their Rare Earth hypothesis, for their book The Life and Death of Planet Earth, alters the calendar so it includes the Earth's future leading up to the Sun's death in the next 5 billion years. As a result, each month now represents 1 of 12 billion years of the Earth's life. According to this calendar, the first life appears in January, and the first animals first appeared in May, with the present day taking place on May 18, even though the Sun won't destroy Earth until December 31, all animals will die out by the end of May.

See also
Cosmic Calendar
Calendar

References

Units of time
Physical cosmology
Time in astronomy
Geology